Lukas Michael MacNaughton (born March 8, 1995) is a professional soccer player who plays as a defender for Major League Soccer club Toronto FC. Born in the United States and raised in Belgium, he represents Canada at international level.

Early life
MacNaughton was born in New York City to an Austrian mother and a Canadian father. When he was seven, he moved to Brussels, Belgium with his family. He played youth soccer with Royale Union Rixensartoise from under-8, until the age of 16, after which he left the club and then played for his school team, International School of Brussels.

College career
After attending high school at the International School of Brussels, he moved to Canada to attend the University of Toronto, where he also played for the Toronto Varsity Blues men's soccer team from 2013 to 2017, where he also served as team captain starting in his second year. He scored his first goal on September 3, 2014, against the Ontario Tech Ridgebacks. He was named an OUA East first-team all-star four times from 2014 to 2017, a CIS second team all-Canadian in 2015, and U Sports second team all-Canadian in 2017. He led the team in goals in 2016. After playing for UofT, he had a trial with Toronto FC II.

Club career
In 2016 and 2017, MacNaughton played his summer soccer with League1 Ontario side North Toronto Nitros, making a total of nine appearances and scoring four goals over two seasons.

In 2018, MacNaughton played for League1 Ontario side Alliance United FC, making eight appearances.

MacNaughton signed for Canadian Premier League club Pacific FC in March 2019. He made his debut in Pacific FC's inaugural match as a starter and received two yellow cards, becoming the club's first ever sent off player in a 1-0 victory over HFX Wanderers. MacNaughton scored his first goal for Pacific FC on July 31, netting a header against Valour FC in an eventual 2-2 draw. He made twenty league appearances that season, scoring two goals, and made two appearances in the Canadian Championship. On January 17, 2020, MacNaughton re-signed with Pacific for the 2020 season. In November 2020, he once again re-signed for the 2021 season.

On January 25, 2022, MacNaughton transferred to MLS side Toronto FC on a two-year contract, with club options for 2024 and 2025, for a rumoured transfer fee of $175k. He made his debut on March 5, coming on as a substitute in a 4-1 loss to the New York Red Bulls. He scored his first goal for Toronto FC on July 26 in the 2022 Canadian Championship Final against Vancouver Whitecaps FC.

International career
MacNaughton was born in the United States (to a Canadian father and his mother was born in Lebanon to Austrian parents). He grew up in Belgium and holds citizenship of Belgium, United States, and Canada.

He represented Canada at the 2015 FISU Universiade Games and 2017 FISU Universiade Games. He scored against Brazil during the 2017 Games.

MacNaughton was called up to the Canada men's national soccer team for the first time in November 2022, for a friendly against Bahrain ahead of the 2022 World Cup. On November 11, he made his debut for the team, coming on as a substitute. He travelled and trained with the team at the 2022 FIFA World Cup, although was not an official member of the 26 man roster.

Personal life
He works as a model for Sutherland Models. He graduated from the University of Toronto with a degree in architecture and worked as an architect for a few months before joining Pacific FC.

Honours

Club
Pacific FC
Canadian Premier League: 2021

Toronto FC
Canadian Championship: 2020

Career statistics

Club

International

References

External links

1995 births
Living people
Footballers from Brussels
Soccer players from New York City
Canadian soccer players
Belgian footballers
Canadian people of Austrian descent
Belgian people of Austrian descent
Belgian people of Canadian descent
Association football defenders
Citizens of Canada through descent
Toronto Varsity Blues soccer players
Alliance United FC players
North Toronto Nitros players
League1 Ontario players
Pacific FC players
Canadian Premier League players
Toronto FC players
Major League Soccer players
Competitors at the 2015 Summer Universiade
Competitors at the 2017 Summer Universiade